"Mutter, der Mann mit dem Koks ist da" is a song by T»MA a.k.a. Falco. It was originally released as a single in early 1996.

The song was later included on Falco's 1998 album Out of the Dark (Into the Light) (released posthumously).

Background and writing 
The song is credited to Peter Hoffmann, Franz Plasa, White Duke, and Edgar Höfler. It is based a late 19th century song of the same name about a street vendor, only in Falco's version the vendor is a drug dealer who sells cocaine.

Commercial performance 
The song reached no. 3 in Austria and no. 11 in Germany.

Track listings 
CD-maxi Sing Sing 74321 31859 2 (BMG) (1996)
 "Mutter, der Mann mit dem Koks ist da" (Video Mix) (3:40)
 "Mutter, der Mann mit dem Koks ist da" (Mother's Favourite) (5:45)
 "Mutter, der Mann mit dem Koks ist da" (Long Line Mix) (6:17)
 "Mutter, der Mann mit dem Koks ist da" (Cinerama Mix) (5:50)
 "Mutter, der Mann mit dem Koks ist da" (TB Line Mix [Club Mix]) (6:13)

Charts

Cover versions 
The song has been covered by German metal bands Stahlhammer and Eisregen.

References

External links 
 T»MA – "Mutter, der Mann mit dem Koks ist da" at Discogs

1996 songs
1996 singles
Falco (musician) songs
Songs written by Falco (musician)
Songs about cocaine
Songs about occupations
Bertelsmann Music Group singles